Gavin James (born 6 January 1989) is a Vincentian international footballer who plays as a striker for Ardley United FC.

He qualifies to play international football for Saint Vincent and the Grenadines through his parents, and on 10 June 2015, he made his debut against Guyana in a World Cup 2018 preliminary round qualifier.

The Guyana Football Federation later protested his eligibility as he was not in possession of a Vincentian passport during the time he played against them. He did, however have confirmation that he held a Vincentian citizenship in the form of a stamp on his British passport. FIFA decided to take no action and told Guyana that "no further intervention was necessary".

References

1989 births
Living people
People with acquired Saint Vincent and the Grenadines citizenship
Saint Vincent and the Grenadines international footballers
Saint Vincent and the Grenadines footballers
English footballers
English people of Saint Vincent and the Grenadines descent
Maidenhead United F.C. players
Wealdstone F.C. players
Marlow F.C. players
Burnham F.C. players
Beaconsfield Town F.C. players
Flackwell Heath F.C. players
Slough Town F.C. players
Southern Football League players
Isthmian League players
National League (English football) players
Thatcham Town F.C. players
Metropolitan Police F.C. players
Bracknell Town F.C. players
Association football forwards